(+)-pulegone reductase is an enzyme with systematic name (-)-menthone:NADP+ oxidoreductase. This enzyme catalises the following chemical reaction

 (1) (-)-menthone + NADP+  (+)-pulegone + NADPH + H+
 (2) (+)-isomenthone + NADP+  (+)-pulegone + NADPH + H+

NADH cannot replace NADPH as reductant.

References

External links 
 

EC 1.3.1